East Harrisburg is a district of neighborhoods in the eastern end of Harrisburg, Pennsylvania. Its southern border is formed by Interstate 83; eastern border is Paxtang along 29th Street; northern border is Market Street and the borough of Penbrook; western border is the Allison Hill neighborhood along 21st Street and including Bellevue Park. The historic former private Bishop McDevitt High School and current public John Harris High School are located in East Harrisburg.

The neighboring Borough of Penbrook was once officially named East Harrisburg.  It still maintains a Harrisburg postal ZIP code.

See also
 East Harrisburg Cemetery
 List of Harrisburg neighborhoods

References

Neighborhoods in Harrisburg, Pennsylvania